Perfumes Of Singapore, formerly known as Perfumes Of The Orient, is a perfume company which produced the scent series called 'Girl'. Notably, it produces the popular Singapore Girl Perfume in the 1960s and 1970s, 

Company Perfumes of Singapore, owned several fragrance brands, but somehow Singapore Girl become very popular and even today, it is sometimes seen being sold at various antique auctions, online and offline. It was sold in most stores, malls and onboard Singapore Airlines.

Perfumes Of The Orient 
Christina Stone and Jeffrey Stone founded Perfumes of the Orient in 1962. Its factories were located in Jurong and Petaling Jaya, Malaysia.

Perfumes Of Singapore 
After her divorce to Jeffrey, Christina married Indian businessman Dadi Balsara  who rebranded the existing scents under the name Perfumes of Singapore. The couple then launched a new scent series called 'Girl'. This included, Australian Girl, California Girl, Hawaii Girl, Hong Kong Girl & Singapore Girl. Of these, most popular was 'Singapore Girl'.

The company closed down in the 2008 after Dadi Balsara secured support from the Indian government to undertake large scale projects in India.

Perfumes of Singapore was Re-registered in 2016 by Singapore Memorie . and have started selling 'Reves De Singapour'  and 'Singapore Girl' again.

Brands sold under Perfumes Of Singapore 
Australian Girl
Singapore Girl 1970's and revived in 2016
California Girl
Hawaii Girl
Hong Kong Girl
Bali
Javanesque
Cinta
Dadi 7
First Lady
Christina
May Ling
Reves De Singapour old and new launched in 2017
Singapore Bliss
Character Perfume – The Group launched a series of perfume which were based on Astrological symbols. There is no name for these, just symbols. The series was insured for $70 million in 1985 by Lloyd's London

Besides perfumes, the brand also manufactured soap and bath oils.

Awards 
Best design and packaging, Singapore Manufacturers Association (1997)

References 

Perfumes